HD 23127 b is a jovian extrasolar planet orbiting the star HD 23127 at the distance of 2.29 AU, taking 3.32 years to orbit. The orbit is very eccentric, a so-called "eccentric Jupiter". At periastron, the distance is 1.28 AU, and at apastron, the distance is 3.30 AU. The mass is at least 1.37 times Jupiter. Only the minimum mass is known because the inclination is not known.

References

Reticulum (constellation)
Exoplanets discovered in 2007
Exoplanets detected by radial velocity
Giant planets in the habitable zone